A corner chisel is a tool for cutting sharp internal corners in wood, often used for mortice joints or hinge rebates. The hole will typically be cut by a router, or occasionally drilled, leaving rounded corners. The function of the corner chisel is therefore similar to the square morticing chisel used on a morticing machine.

Woodworking chisels
Chisels